This is a list of VTV dramas released in 2016.

←2015 - 2016 - 2017→

VTV Special Tet dramas
This drama airs from 20:10 to 21:00, 27th-28th & 1st-2nd Tet holiday on VTV1.

VTV1 Weeknight Prime-time dramas

Monday-Wednesday dramas
These dramas air from 20:45 to 21:30, Monday to Wednesday on VTV1.

Starting in June 2016, the time slot 'Monday and Tuesday' was changed to 'Monday to Wednesday'. Only Mạch ngầm vùng biên ải was aired on Monday and Tuesday due to the old time slot.

Thursday-Friday dramas
These dramas air from 20:45 to 21:30, Thursday and Friday on VTV1.

Starting in June 2016, the time slot 'Wednesday to Friday' was changed to 'Thursday and Friday'. Only Gia phả của đất was aired on Wednesday to Friday due to the old time slot.

VTV3 Weeknight Prime-time dramas

Monday-Tuesday dramas
These dramas air from 21:10 to 22:00, Monday and Tuesday on VTV3.

Wednesday–Thursday dramas
These dramas air from 21:10 to 22:00, Wednesday and Thursday on VTV3.

VTV3 Rubic 8 dramas
These dramas air from 14:20 to 15:10, Saturday and Sunday on VTV3 as a part of the program Rubic 8.

See also
 List of dramas broadcast by Vietnam Television (VTV)
 List of dramas broadcast by Hanoi Radio Television (HanoiTV)
 List of dramas broadcast by Vietnam Digital Television (VTC)
List of television programmes broadcast by Vietnam Television (VTV)

References

External links
VTV.gov.vn – Official VTV Website 
VTV.vn – Official VTV Online Newspaper 

Vietnam Television original programming
2016 in Vietnamese television